The 2019 Nigerian Senate election in Taraba State was held on February 23, 2019, to elect members of the Nigerian Senate to represent Taraba State. Emmanuel Bwacha representing Taraba South and Shuaibu Isa Lau representing Taraba North won on the platform of Peoples Democratic Party, while Yusuf Abubakar Yusuf representing Taraba Central won on the platform of All Progressives Congress.

Overview

Summary

Results

Taraba South 
A total of 16 candidates registered with the Independent National Electoral Commission to contest in the election. PDP candidate Emmanuel Bwacha won the election, defeating APC Bauka Ishaya Gamgum and 14 other party candidates.

Taraba North 
A total of 19 candidates registered with the Independent National Electoral Commission to contest in the election. PDP candidate Shuaibu Isa Lau won the election, defeating APC Yusuf Ahmed Adamu and 17 other party candidate.

Taraba Central 
A total of 11 candidates registered with the Independent National Electoral Commission to contest in the election. APC candidate Yusuf Abubakar Yusuf won the election, defeating PDP Dahiru Bako Gassol and 9 other party candidate.

References 

Taraba State senatorial elections